Chhota Singh (born 1918) is an Indian long-distance runner. He competed in the marathon at the 1948 Summer Olympics.

References

External links
 

1918 births
Possibly living people
Athletes (track and field) at the 1948 Summer Olympics
Indian male long-distance runners
Indian male marathon runners
Olympic athletes of India
Sportspeople from Patiala
Asian Games medalists in athletics (track and field)
Asian Games gold medalists for India
Athletes (track and field) at the 1951 Asian Games
Medalists at the 1951 Asian Games